Joel M. Skousen (born September 22, 1946) is a political commentator on the philosophy of law and Constitutional theory.

History
Skousen, born in San Diego and raised in Oregon, served as a USMC fighter pilot during the Vietnam Era.  During the 1980s Skousen was the chairman of the Conservative National Committee. He was also the executive editor of Conservative Digest.

Skousen is the founder and chief editor of World Affairs Brief, a weekly news-analysis service. Some of Skousen's views are controversial. He made the case that the Fall of Communism was, also as claimed by KGB defector Anatoliy Golitsyn, a "carefully crafted deception," meant to gain Western aid and technology transfers that would eventually end in a resurgence of the Russian threat. In his weekly briefings Skousen has also written extensively about the evidence of conspiracy by government to cover up its own involvement in numerous black operations such as the JFK assassination, the Oklahoma City bombing, TWA 800 and the 9/11 attack on the World Trade Center. He is particularly a harsh critic of what he calls the "phony war on terror" used to conjure up justification for continual foreign intervention and the diminution of American constitutional rights; he is also very critical of globalism, communism, and the U.S. interventionist foreign policy.

Skousen has written several books. including Essential Principles for the Conservation of Liberty, Strategic Relocation—North American Guide to Safe Places, The Secure Home, Survival Home Manual: Architectural Design, Construction, and Remodeling Of Self-Sufficient Residences and Retreats, and How to Implement a High Security Shelter in the Home.  He also published a booklet titled 10 Packs for Survival, which he has also posted to several web sites.

Skousen designs and consults on hardened retreat homes, often including fallout shelters with HEPA air filtration systems. He has offered in both North and Central America consultation regarding architectural and retreat design. In the book Dancing at Armageddon: Survivalism and Chaos in Modern Times by Richard G. Mitchell, Jr., (2001) Skousen was quoted: "'You never want to make a house look like an obvious fortress. Those who want in can always move up a bigger gun. There is no way you can design a home to withstand RPG (Rocket-propelled grenade) rockets and tanks. I design these homes so you virtually cannot tell inside or out that they are any different from a conventional home.'"

Because of its low population density and diverse economy, both Skousen and survivalist writer James Wesley Rawles recommend the Intermountain West region of the United States, as a preferred region for relocation and setting up survival retreats.

In late 2007, Skousen gained attention when he gave his support to Ron Paul rather than to fellow LDS church member Mitt Romney in the 2008 US presidential campaign, in a widely circulated YouTube video clip. After John McCain became the Republican Party's presumptive nominee in early 2008, Skousen also endorsed Pastor Chuck Baldwin of the Constitution Party: "As Ron Paul goes back to Congress to continue the fight there, I believe Chuck Baldwin is the person to continue the fight during this election cycle and beyond."

Personal life
Joel Skousen is the older brother of Mark Skousen and the younger brother of Royal Skousen. The three Skousen brothers are the nephews of conservative author and commentator W. Cleon Skousen.

In March 2013, Skousen walked away with just slight injuries from the crash of his Glasair kit plane, in a forced rough field landing, following a fuel system failure. The crash landing occurred near Spanish Fork, Utah, on the return leg of a cross country flight to Las Vegas.

Skousen lives in Orem, Utah.

Quotes

 Many Christians think it is wonderful any time government officials mention God or quote from the Bible. I take strong exception, and not because I believe it is improper for government officials to appeal to God. I simply object to dropping the name of God or quoting scripture to cover for evil, and otherwise convince naive troops and Christians in general that an evil cause is just.
 More than ever, I still consider the nuclear attack on America as inevitable, both because the real axis of evil (Russia and China) are still building for that attack, and because our own government is controlled by those intent upon destroying US sovereignty and delivering our nation over to a socialist New World Order (NWO). [2006]
 The one thing you can learn from the liberal and controlled media, including arch liberal newspapers like the Washington Post, NY Times, and LA Times, is the direction in which the conspiracy against liberty is going. I spend about a third of my time watching what the opposition does. When they start uniformly promoting certain issues in all the liberal journals (global warming, smart growth, gun control, etc.), it is obvious that there is some coordination going on. But remember, you can only learn to see through the selectively filtered news dispensed by the establishment media if you have other sources that feed you the missing pieces.
 In terms of unity, we are at a real disadvantage up against the left.  It only takes one thing in common for "liberals" to unite.  It only takes one difference of opinion for conservatives to divide.

Bibliography

See also

Blast shelter
Intentional community
Self-sufficiency

References

External links
Skousen's web site
World Affairs Brief, Joel Skousen's weekly news analysis
10 Packs for Survival
Joel Skousen Bill of Rights Day Speech, Salt Lake City, Utah. December 15, 2007

1946 births
Living people
20th-century American male writers
20th-century American non-fiction writers
21st-century American male writers
21st-century American non-fiction writers
American aviators
American conspiracy theorists
American consultants
American finance and investment writers
American male non-fiction writers
American political commentators
American political scientists
American political writers
Brigham Young University alumni
InfoWars people
Latter Day Saints from California
Latter Day Saints from Oregon
Latter Day Saints from Utah
Non-interventionism
People from Orem, Utah
Survivalists
United States Marine Corps officers
United States Naval Aviators
Writers from Oregon
Writers from San Diego